The Visual Resources Association (also known as VRA) is an international organization for image media professionals.

VRA was founded in 1982 by slide librarians (visual resources curators) who were members of the College Art Association (CAA), the South Eastern Art Conference (SECAC), the Art Libraries Society of North America (ARLIS/NA), and the Mid-America College Art Association (MACAA).  The association is concerned with creating, describing, and distributing digital images and other media; educating image professionals; and developing standards. The Visual Resources Association Foundation, a 501 C-3 organization created by the VRA, supports research and education in visual resources, and provides educational, literary, and scientific outreach to the archival and library community and the general public.

Goals

The association is a multi-disciplinary organization whose purpose is furthering research and education in the field of image management in educational, cultural heritage, and commercial environments.  The VRA develops standards, offers educational programs, and publishes a variety of material. It offers a forum for preservation of and access to digital and analog images of visual culture; cataloging and classification standards and practices; integration of technology-based instruction and research; intellectual property policy; and other topics of interest to the field. It works with the broader information management and educational communities to support the primacy of visual information in documenting and understanding the cultural experience.

Membership

In 2010, the VRA had 800 members, mostly from the United States and Canada, but also from Israel, Mexico, and the United Kingdom.  The membership includes: information specialists; digital image specialists; art, architecture, film and video librarians; museum curators; slide, photograph, microfilm, and digital archivists; architectural firms; galleries; publishers; image system vendors; rights and reproductions officials; photographers; art historians; artists; and scientists.  There are thirteen local chapters, including Canada
Great Lakes
Greater New York
International
Mid-Atlantic
Midwest
New England
Northern California
Pacific Rim
Southeast
Southern California
Texas
Upstate New York

The VRA Board consists of seven officers. The 2014 President is Elaine Paul, University of Colorado Boulder; the previous President was Jolene de Verges, Southern Methodist University

History
 
From 1968, visual resources curators had been meeting during the College Art Association's annual conferences to discuss issues of particular interest to those involved with the management of art slide collections. During the next few years, the group remained essentially an ad hoc committee.

By the late 1970s, regional and international activity had begun. The Comité International d’Histoire de l’Art (CIHA) recognized the visual resources subgroup as an important part of that international association. Visual resources sessions were provided during its conference in Bologna in 1979, and continued for almost 20 years. The Southeastern College Art Conference (SECAC) and the Mid-America College Art Association (MACAA) included visual resources sessions at their conferences.

Visual resources curators within the MACAA group, led by Nancy DeLaurier of the University of Missouri, Kansas City, met during MACAA’s annual conferences. In 1972, this group began to meet independently, creating workshops and sessions on various aspects of visual resources maintenance. For the workshops, members developed several kits for the benefit of attending visual resources managers. These kits included information on slide room management, standards, and other practical aspects of the profession. This group also created a newsletter, Slides and Photographs Newsletter, which contained news and information on issues of concern to members. This newsletter was supported by CAA and later by MACAA and eventually became known as the International Bulletin for Photographic Documentation of the Visual Arts.

In 1982, after almost a decade of informal association, visual resources curators active in CAA, MACAA, SECAC, and ARLIS/NA,  formalized an independent association and held the first official meeting  during the annual CAA meeting in Philadelphia in February 1983.

In the 1990s, the explosion of the Internet and the consequent expansion of the visual resources field to   include digital media expanded the role of the association. It led in the effort to develop public understanding of  intellectual property rights, protocols for dissemination of digital material, standards of cataloging, and the importance of broad public access to digital cultural information.

The annual conferences began attracting  non-members,  while vraweb.org evolved into a source of information for students, professionals, free-lance photographers, even IPR rights managers.  Cataloging Cultural Objects (CCO) gained national recognition as an attempt to standardize the cataloging of visual information, and its workshops, web site, and outreach efforts began educating a broad audience.

The Education Committee sponsored conference workshops on topics of broad interest at the VRA conference and also at other professional conferences. The Digital Scene, a feature of vraweb.org, featured information on collaborative projects, new standards in imaging and metadata, digital preservation issues, consortial projects, training opportunities, and reports from the field. In 2004, the VRA, in conjunction with the ARLIS/NA, began offering a Summer Educational Institute to provide in-depth educational to new professionals.

Professional Awards

VRA Distinguished Service Award
Each year the Visual Resources Association honors an individual who has made an outstanding career contribution to the field of visual resources and image management. Nominees must have achieved a level of distinction in the field either through leadership, research, or service to the profession. The award has gone to: 
2019 Robb Detlefs
2018 Betha Whitlow 
2017 Allan T. Kohl
2016 Ann Baird Whiteside
2015 Maureen Burns 
2014 Macie Hall
2013 Elisa Lanzi
2012 Kathe Hicks Albrecht
2011 Eileen Fry
2008 Christine E. Hilker
2007 Maryly Snow
2006 Lynda S. White
2005 John Taormina
2004 Jenni Rodda
2003 Margaret N. Webster
2002 Sandra C. Walker
2001 Linda McRae
2000 Elizabeth J. Antrim
1999 Rebecca M. Hoort
1998 Brenda MacEachern
1997 Christina B. Updike
1996 Nancy Shelby Schuller
1995 Eleanor Fink
1994 Eleanor Collins and Margaret Nolan
1993 Luraine Tansey
1991 Joy Blouin and Helene E. Roberts
1989 Nancy DeLaurier
1988 Christine L. Sundt

VRA Nancy DeLaurier Award
The Nancy DeLaurier Award, named for one of the pioneers of the visual resources profession (who received the VRA Distinguished Service Award in 1989), annually honors a visual resources professional for distinguished achievement in the field.  Past recipients are: 
2017 Anne Young
2014 Ann Baird Whiteside
2013 Greg Reser
2012 Gretchen Wagner
2011 Renate Wiedenhoeft
2010 Murtha Baca and Patricia Harpring
2009 Loy Zimmerman
2008 Kathleen Cohen
2007 Norine Duncan and Susan Jane Williams
2005 John Taormina and Mary Wassermann
2003 Allan T. Kohl and Christina B. Updike
2002 Christine L. Sundt

Publications

VRA Bulletin, a scholarly journal, is the flagship publication of the Association.
Membership Directory is published annually.  
Special Bulletins are occasional publications on  specific topics. Full list here
VRA-L is the Listserv, for members only.
VRAweb.org is the public website, with both public and members-only sections.

Standards

Cataloguing Cultural Objects (CCO)
Cataloging Cultural Objects: A Guide to Describing Cultural Works and Their Images (CCO) is a data content standard published in 2006, sponsored by VRA, and published by the American Library Association (ALA).  The project was largely funded by the Getty Foundation. The guide was designed for those who describe and document works of art, architecture, and cultural artifacts.

VRA Core Categories
Since the 1980s, VRA has worked on creating standards to describe images. To replace the earlier widely varying practices, the association created a common standard, the VRA Core Categories. Somewhat based on the Dublin Core model, the Core has grown from a list of elements describing art and architectural images to a data standard (with an XML schema to promote the sharing of records) for describing images.  The first version was published in 1996, with revisions in 1998, 2002, 2004, and 2007 (resulting in the current version, 4.0.) .  In November 2010, the Network Development and MARC Standards Office of the Library of Congress began hosting VRA Core 4 in partnership with the VRA. Core 4 is the only metadata standard designed specifically for the description of images and the cultural objects they represent. Core 4 is uniquely able to capture descriptive information about works and images, and indicate relationships between the two. Since 2014 a VRA Ontology is available to transform VRA Core 4 XML data into RDF/XML.

Events

Annual Conference
The association's  annual conference is held in a different city each year. It features workshops, sessions, tours, and seminars, along with social interaction and vendor displays. 
2022, Baltimore
2021, (virtual)Chicago
2020, Baltimore (canceled) 
2019, Los Angeles
2018, Philadelphia
2017, Louisville
2016, Seattle
2015, Denver
2014, Milwaukee
2013, Providence
2012, Albuquerque
2011, Minneapolis
2010, Atlanta
2009, Toronto
2008, San Diego
2007, Kansas City
2006, Baltimore
2005, Miami
2004, Portland
2003, Houston
2002, St. Louis
2001, Chicago
2000, San Francisco
1999, Los Angeles
1998, Philadelphia
1997, New York
1996, Boston

Summer Educational Institute
The Summer Educational Institute (SEI) is a joint project with ARLIS/NA. It offers standardized  training in image collection management, with a focus on the transition from analog to digital collections. It is held in varied geographical locations to permit maximum attendance:
2018, University of New Mexico, Albuquerque
2017, University of North Carolina, Chapel Hill
2016, University of North Carolina, Chapel Hill
2015, University of Illinois, Urbana-Champaign
2014, University of Illinois, Urbana-Champaign
2013, University of Michigan, Ann Arbor
2012, University of Michigan, Ann Arbor
2011, University of New Mexico
2010, University of New Mexico
2009, Simmons College
2008, James Madison University
2007, Indiana University
2006, Reed College
2005, Duke University
2004, Duke University

See also
Slide library
Art Libraries Society of North America
Metadata standards

References

Bibliography
Art Libraries Society of North America. 1983. Standards for art libraries and fine arts slide collections. Tucson, AZ: Art Libraries Society of North America. 
Baca, Murtha, Patricia Harpring, Elisa Lanzi, Linda McRae, and Ann Whiteside. 2006. Cataloging cultural objects: a guide to describing cultural works and their images. Chicago: American Library Association. 
Freeman, Carla Conrad, and Barbara Stevenson. 1995. The visual resources directory: art slide and photograph collections in the United States and Canada. Visual resources series. Englewood, Colo: Libraries Unlimited. 
Irvine, Betty Jo, and Eileen Fry. 1979. Slide libraries: a guide for academic institutions, museums, and special collections. Littleton, Colo: Libraries Unlimited. 
Schuller, Nancy S. 1989. Management for visual resources collections. Englewood, Colo: Libraries Unlimited. 
Sutcliffe, Glyn. 1995. Slide collection management in libraries and information units. Aldershot, England: Gower. 
Walker, Sandra C., Donald W. Beetham, and Norine D. Cashman. 1999. Image buyers' guide: an international directory of sources for slides and digital images for art and architecture. Visual resources series. Englewood, Colo: Libraries Unlimited. 
White, Brenda. 1967. Slide collections: a survey of their organisation in libraries in the fields of architecture, building, and planning.  Edinburgh: Brenda White, 21 Morningside Gardens.

External links
 VRA Web Site
 VRA Core (Library of Congress)
 Cataloging Cultural Objects
 Summer Educational Institute (SEI)
 VRA Foundation
 Images, the association's  online news Bulletin  
 Special publications

Library associations
Professional associations based in the United States